Satyabhama Devi  was an Indian politician. She was elected to the Lok Sabha, the lower house of the Parliament of India from the Jahanabad in Bihar as a member of the Indian National Congress. She donated 500 bighas(to Vinoba bhabhe) of land in bhoodan movement for the Upliftment of depressed class.

References

External links
Official biographical sketch in Parliament of India website

1911 births
Indian National Congress politicians from Bihar
India MPs 1957–1962
India MPs 1962–1967
Lok Sabha members from Bihar
Year of death missing
Women members of the Lok Sabha